Francis Harvey Harlow (22 January 1928 – 1 July 2016) was an American theoretical physicist known for his work in the field of fluid dynamics. He was a researcher at Los Alamos National Laboratory, Los Alamos, New Mexico. Harlow is credited with establishing the science of computational fluid dynamics (CFD) as an important discipline.

He is known for his fundamental contributions to the development of several CFD algorithms for computer simulation of fluid flows, including Particle-In-Cell (PIC), Fluid-In-Cell (FLIC), and Marker-and-Cell (MAC) methods. Harlow was a Fellow of the American Physical Society.  He was also a noted expert on the pottery of the Puebloan peoples of New Mexico, publishing in this field as well as in physics, and donated his extensive and significant collection of Puebloan pottery to the Museum of Indian Arts and Culture several years before his death. In 2016, Harlow's autobiography was published in the collection Adventures in Physics and Pueblo Pottery: Memoirs of a Los Alamos Scientist.

Awards and honors
Harlow was a fellow of the American Physical Society since 2003. He was selected "For his contributions to our understanding of low-speed, free-surface, and turbulent flow through computational modeling, and his invention of completely original methods to address these issues." In 2004, he received Los Alamos Medal, the highest honor given to an individual or small group by LANL.

Selected publications

References

American physicists
Computational fluid dynamicists
Los Alamos National Laboratory personnel
Fellows of the American Physical Society
1928 births
2016 deaths